The Prophet is an album by jazz organist Johnny Hammond recorded for the Kudu label (a subsidiary of CTI Records) in 1972.

Track listing
All compositions by Johnny "Hammond" Smith except where noted
 "Prophet" (Alfred Ellis) - 7:35  
 "Tomorrow Belongs to the Children" (Bob Gundry) - 4:00  
 "Witchy Woman" (Bernie Leadon, Don Henley) - 5:00  
 "Thunder and Lightning" (Chi Coltrane) - 7:10  
 "Stand Behind Me" (Carole King) - 4:05  
 "Corner of the Sky" (Stephen Schwartz) - 6:35

Personnel
Johnny Hammond - organ
John Eckert, Jon Faddis, Marvin Stamm - trumpet, flugelhorn
Wayne Andre, Dick Griffin - trombone
Tony Studd - bass trombone
Jerry Dodgion, Maceo Parker - tenor saxophone
Pepper Adams, Cecil Payne - baritone saxophone
Eric Gale - guitar
Ron Carter - bass
Billy Cobham - drums
Airto Moreira - percussion
Andrew Primus - steel drum
Pee Wee Ellis - arranger, conductor, electric piano, melodica 
Carl Carldwell, Lani Groves, Tasha Thomas - vocals (tracks 3 & 6)
Buddy Lucas - harmonica (track 3)
Hubert Laws - flute (track 5)

Production
 Creed Taylor - producer
 Rudy Van Gelder - engineer

References

Johnny "Hammond" Smith albums
1972 albums
Kudu Records albums
Albums produced by Creed Taylor
Albums recorded at Van Gelder Studio